Ictíneo II was a pioneering submarine launched in 1864 by the Spanish engineer Narcís Monturiol and it was the first air independent and combustion powered submarine and the first submarine to overcome the basic problems of machine powered underwater navigation.

History
The Ictíneo II was originally intended as an improved version of the handpowered Ictíneo I. The Spanish Navy pledged support to Monturiol but did not actually supply it, so he had to raise funds himself, writing a letter to the nation to encourage a popular subscription which raised 300,000 pesetas from citizens of Spain and was used to form the company La Navegación Submarina to develop the Ictíneo II.

After reading about the American Civil War and the attempts at submarine construction such as the CSS Hunley, the financially desperate Monturiol wrote to the US Secretary of the Navy; however, the Civil War had ended by the time the Secretary responded.

Dissatisfied with the limitations placed on him by human propulsion, Monturiol realized that the only option was steam power, but contemporary steam engines required a fire which was not an option for a submarine. To this end he invented an air independent engine, which ran on a chemical reaction fueled by peroxide that provided its own oxygen for combustion.

Monturiol intended to develop the submarine for its commercial use in the exploitation of coral reefs. Later he installed a gun inside the submarine's hull and performed a number of trials involving underwater shots on predetermined targets from 22 December to 30 December 1865, but this failed to impress the military authorities.

Monturiol envisaged a new vessel, custom built to house his new engine, which would be entirely built of metal with the engine housed in its own separate compartment. However, due to the state of his finances, construction of a new vessel was out of the question, and instead he managed to assemble enough funds to fit the engine into the Ictíneo II.

Two months later, on 14 December, Monturiol submerged the vessel and ran his chemical engine, but with a quite slow speed of 2.5 knots.

On 23 December, La Navegación Submarina went bankrupt, having completely exhausted its funds. The chief creditor called in his debt, and Monturiol was forced to surrender the Ictíneo II, which was his sole asset. The creditor subsequently sold it on to a businessman, and the authorities, who taxed all ships, issued its new owner with a tax bill. Rather than pay, he dismantled the entire submarine and sold it for scrap. The ship's surface motor was removed to a textile factory; the viewports ended up as bathroom windows.

Description

She was built of olive wood with oak reinforcements, and a 2 mm thick layer of copper. The submarine could be steered from the conning tower by means of an endless screw gear.

Four ballast tanks of  capacity were located symmetrically on each side in the free flooding areas between the streamlined outer light hull and the inner pressure hull. The ballast tanks would be flooded at will to submerge and surfacing was achieved by forcing air into them with a pump. Pitch during diving was controlled by a weight which could be moved longitudinally along a rail, remotely controlled by the helmsman. The submarine also had an emergency mechanism intended to jettison the ballast to allow it to surface quickly.

The most important innovation in the Ictíneo II was its air independent propulsion for underwater navigation. A reaction of zinc, manganese dioxide and potassium chlorate heated the boiler of a steam engine to provide propulsion and illumination and the oxygen released by the reaction could be used for breathing.  Monturiol purchased a six-cylinder steam engine and divided it in half; one half was  powered by a coal-burning boiler for surface propulsion while the other half was powered by a separate boiler heated by his chemical mixture.

See also
Ictineo I
Ictineu 3
Type V-80 submarine

References

1864 ships
19th-century submarines
Submarines of Spain
Spanish inventions

nl:Narcís Monturiol#Ictineo II
Experimental submarines